Rising Phoenix is a 2020 documentary film directed by Ian Bonhôte and Peter Ettedgui and starring Tatyana McFadden, Bebe Vio and Jonnie Peacock. The film conveys the stories of nine Paralympic athletes and their journeys in competition.

Rising Phoenix was released on August 26, 2020 on Netflix. The film has received positive reviews from critics. Rising Phoenix has a Rotten Tomatoes rating of  based on reviews from  critics.

Rising Phoenix is an HTYT Films and Passion Pictures production in association with Ventureland and Misfits Entertainment.

References

External links
 
 

2020 films
2020 documentary films
Netflix original documentary films
Films scored by Daniel Pemberton
British documentary films
2020s English-language films
2020s British films